German developments that employ green building techniques include:
The Solarsiedlung (Solar Settlement) in Freiburg, Germany, which features PlusEnergy houses.
The Sonnenschiff (Sun Ship) in Freiburg, Germany, which is also built according to German solar architect Rolf Disch PlusEnergy standards.
The Vauban quarter, also in Freiburg.
Houses designed by Baufritz, incorporating passive solar design, heavily insulated walls, triple-glaze doors and windows, non-toxic paints and finishes, summer shading, heat recovery ventilation, and greywater treatment systems.
The new Reichstag building in Berlin, which produces its own energy.
The Heichrich Böll Siedlung in Berlin-Pankow as a forerunner for Green Building in post-cold war Berlin emphasizes on "every day ecology", instead of High-Tech-Measurements.

In January 2009, the first German certificates for sustainable buildings were handed over. The standard for the new certificates is developed by the DGNB (Deutsche Gesellschaft für nachhaltiges Bauen e.V. - German Sustainable Building Council) and the BMVBS (Bundesministeriums für Verkehr, Bau und Stadtentwicklung - Federal Ministry of Transport, Building and Urban Affairs)

See also
Heliotrope (building)

References

External links
German Sustainable building Council
Cost Efficient Passive Houses as European Standards
Baufritz' Natural Construction Standard

Sustainability in Germany